José Juan Luque Jiménez (born 16 October 1977) is a Spanish retired professional footballer who played as a left winger.

Club career
Born in Cantillana, Province of Seville, Luque started playing professionally for Sevilla FC, appearing mostly for the reserves. His debut in La Liga was on 1 March 1997 in a 2–3 away loss against Atlético Madrid, and he appeared in nine matches as the season ended in relegation.

In the summer of 1998, after one season with CD Badajoz in the second division, Luque moved to Atlético de Madrid. He played with the Colchoneros mostly in the second level, and also represented the B-team before leaving the club on 30 June 2002; he was also loaned to Albacete Balompié for five months, in January 1999.

Luque split 2002–03 with RCD Espanyol and Elche CF, the former in the top flight. Subsequently, he joined Málaga CF (the first of his two spells), being rarely used over one and a half years and signing for Ciudad de Murcia in the 2005 winter transfer window. He scored a career-best 20 goals in his first full campaign as his side narrowly missed on top division promotion, being crowned joint-top scorer alongside Ikechukwu Uche of Recreativo de Huelva.

In 2007–08, Luque finished third in the Pichichi Trophy race, but Ciudad, now renamed Granada 74 CF, was eventually relegated to division three. In very late August 2009, after having completed the pre-season with Málaga – he even started and scored in a 1–3 loss against Atlante F.C. in that year's Peace Cup– he was released and soon moved to fellow league team Real Murcia, on a free transfer. He only appeared in one fourth of the league matches during the season, and his team also dropped down a tier.

In January 2011, after 325 games and 75 goals in the two major levels of Spanish football (but only 49/3 in the top level), 33-year-old Luque had his first abroad experience, signing for Diósgyőri VTK from Hungary.

Honours
Atlético Madrid
Segunda División: 2001–02

Diósgyőr
Nemzeti Bajnokság II: 2010–11

References

External links

1977 births
Living people
People from Vega del Guadalquivir
Sportspeople from the Province of Seville
Spanish footballers
Footballers from Andalusia
Association football wingers
La Liga players
Segunda División players
Segunda División B players
Sevilla Atlético players
Sevilla FC players
CD Badajoz players
Atlético Madrid B players
Albacete Balompié players
Atlético Madrid footballers
RCD Espanyol footballers
Elche CF players
Málaga CF players
Ciudad de Murcia footballers
Granada 74 CF footballers
Real Murcia players
Nemzeti Bajnokság I players
Diósgyőri VTK players
Spain youth international footballers
Spanish expatriate footballers
Expatriate footballers in Hungary
Spanish expatriate sportspeople in Hungary